Jakes Island is an island in San Francisco Bay. It is in Marin County, California. Egrets can be seen there.

References

Islands of Marin County, California
Islands of San Francisco Bay
Islands of Northern California